Hajjiabad (also Romanized as Ḩājjīābād; also known as Khargalān and Kharkalān) is a village in Beyranvand-e Jonubi Rural District, Bayravand District, Khorramabad County, Lorestan Province, Iran. At the 2006 census, its population was 62, in 12 families.

References 

Towns and villages in Khorramabad County